The Nation Blue is a rock band formed in Tasmania and based in Melbourne, Victoria, noted for their intense live performances and bleak subject matter. They have toured nationally in Australia and internationally in Brazil, America and Japan and have supported Helmet and Foo Fighters.  In the third song of their first set in support of the Foo Fighters, bass player, Matt Weston, dislocated his knee but saw out the remainder of the set while lying painfully on the stage floor.

At the fourth annual AIR Awards, held on 22 November 2009, The Nation Blue won the 'Best Independent Hard Rock/Punk Album' award for Rising Waters.

Members
Tom Lyngcoln – vocals, guitar
Matt Weston – bass
Dan McKay – drums

Discography
 Descend ep (2000) – Fear of Children
 A Blueprint For Modern Noise (2001) – Trial and Error
 Damnation (2004) – Casadeldisco Records
 Protest Songs (2007) – Casadeldisco Records
 Rising Waters (2009) – Casadeldisco / Shock
 Black (2016) – Poison City Records
 Blue (2016) – Poison City Records

Awards

AIR Awards
The Australian Independent Record Awards (commonly known informally as AIR Awards) is an annual awards night to recognise, promote and celebrate the success of Australia's Independent Music sector.

|-
| AIR Awards of 2009
|Rising Waters 
| Best Independent Hard Rock/Punk Album
| 
|-

References

External links
Myspace page
The Dwarf The Nation Blue – Get Angry

Australian rock music groups
Tasmanian musical groups
Victoria (Australia) musical groups
Musical groups from Melbourne